The Kurzweil K2000 is a digital synthesizer and music workstation produced by Kurzweil Music Systems between 1991 and 2000 in a variety of standard configurations, including rack-mountable versions and models that came with 16-bit user sampling.

The K2000 features a complex digital synthesis architecture dubbed V.A.S.T., which stands for "Variable Architecture Synthesis Technology", Kurzweil's marketing term for the digital signal processing (DSP) sound processing system used in the K2000 and other members of its K2xxx series.

Variable Architecture Synthesis Technology (V.A.S.T.)

Summary

V.A.S.T. stands for variable-architecture synthesis technology. It is variable in that the user can select different signal paths, which contain different DSP functions, for use in creating and shaping a sound. V.A.S.T. also includes an extensive modulation system, similar in concept to that of analog modular synthesizers. A wide array of modulation sources can be assigned to various parameters within a signal path, and modulation sources can be combined to create new modulation sources.

Details
The basic component of a V.A.S.T. program is a "layer". A layer on the K2000 contains a single "algorithm", which contains up to four slots for user-assignable DSP functions. The algorithm assigned to a layer is preceded by several other functions, or "blocks". There is the "keymap" block, which determines which (if any) samples are assigned to the keyboard in the layer. This is succeeded by the "pitch" block, which determines how the "keymap" is pitched across the keyboard. Following the "algorithm" section is an amplifier block (and a dedicated multi-mode envelope to modulate the gain of the sound over time) and, finally, an "output" block that determines which group of outputs (there are four output groups on the rack version, two on the keyboard version) the sound is assigned to and how it is panned between the two outputs in a stereo group. In essence, therefore, we have:

[keymap] - [pitch] - [algorithm] - [amp] - [output]

Up to 3 layers can make up a normal "program", and 32 layers for drum programs similar to a "patch" on other synthesizers. [N.B.: 3 layers are possible on the K2500 (3 on the K2000 series) as "Drum Programs" (using any types of patches, not just drums), and may be used on 8 consecutive MIDI channels. The PC3 and K2600 series allow 32 layers on all channels.]  Within a program, each layer can have independent settings in all of the various blocks, including different algorithms, pan positions, output mappings, etc. Modulation sources can be routed to almost all of these, and can be independently assigned within a layer and between layers. Thus using a particular modulation source in one "block" does not exclude it from being used elsewhere (for instance you could assign keystroke velocity to control, say, filter frequency cutoff and resonance in one layer, while in another it can be assigned to control pitch or pan position) .

There are 31 algorithms available in the K2000, the allowed DSP functions for each algorithm are detailed in section 26 of the K2000 user manual. For example, algorithm 9 can be configured as follows:

[SAW]-[SW+SHP]-[LP2RES]-[AMP]

Adding this to the basic patch layout shown above gives:

[keymap] - [pitch] - [SAW] - [SW+SHP] - [LP2RES] - [AMP] - [amp] - [output]

The DSP functions are described in detail in section 14 of the K2000 user manual. In this particular example, the sample mapped to the keyboard via the keymap block does not sound; instead a sawtooth wave will be combined with another sawtooth wave and fed through the "shaper" (which, in essence, allows one wave to frequency modulate another), then through a 2-pole lowpass filter with a fixed resonance, and finally through two gain stages to the output.

At each point in the pipeline there are parameters that can be modulated by control sources. These parameters vary depending on which "block" is being modulated. For instance, for the [SAW] DSP block the user can assign various modulations sources to modulate the pitch of the sawtooth wave. There are, generally speaking, three sources that can be assigned to modulate a parameter. In the case of the [SAW] DSP block, the user can specify a starting pitch and determine how the pitch will track across the keyboard by specifying the amount of modulation supplied by each key in cents (via "Keytrk", or key track). The user can also assign modulation sources to "Src1" and "Src2" and specify the depth of the modulation amount (for "Src1", the user can specify "Depth". for "Src2", "MinDpt" and "MaxDpt"). Additionally, "Src2" has a "Dptctl" (depth control) parameter—a control source that will determine how much the control source assigned to "Src2" will modulate the parameter. For example, a user may assign a key tracking value of 100 cents (causing a keyboard controller to play a 12-tone Western scale), assign "Src1" to a knob on a MIDI controller with a "Depth" value of 1200 cents (to tune the whole keyboard up or down by an octave), and assign "Src2" to be modulated by "LFO1". Further, the "MinDpt" and "MaxDpt" can be set to -100 cents and 100 cents respectively, and the "Dptctrl" can be assigned to another knob on a MIDI controller. This would provide a "vibrato" effect whose speed is controlled by "LFO1" (or low-frequency oscillator) and whose depth is controlled by the assigned MIDI control.

Some DSP blocks take up two or three slots, and each of those slots represents a value that can be modulated using one of the assignable control sources. For instance, the "4POLE LOPASS W/ SEP" (actually two 2-pole lowpass filters which can operate in unison or at different frequencies) DSP block takes up 3 slots. The first is used to set the frequency for the filter, the second to set the resonance, and the third to set the "separation" between the two 2-pole filters. Just as in the case of the [SAW] DSP block, each of those parameters can be modulated by three control sources.

A discussion of V.A.S.T. would not be complete without mentioning "FUNs". "FUN" stands for "function", and these are mathematical equations that take two values (a and b) as inputs and perform an operation on them. FUN equations include "a+b", "a*b", "b/(1-a)", and many others of varying complexity. They also allow for self-modulation; some FUNs introduce a variable "y" which represents the most recent output of the FUN. The Kurzweil evaluates each FUN every 20 milliseconds, hence it can take that value and plug it back into the equation if the equation has "y" as an input variable. Any modulation source can be assigned to a or b (or both at the same time) in a FUN. This can be used to mix two modulation sources, cause one to multiply the effects of another, and so forth. Internally, the K2000 rescales whatever value is currently being sent by the control source to a number between -1 and 1 (for bipolar control sources. Unipolar sources are scaled between 0 and 1), then applies the function and returns an output value. Using FUNS, therefore, more than three control sources can be assigned to modulate a parameter in a block since you can assign a FUN as a modulation source for "Src1", "Src2", or "Dptctl". Four FUNs are available per layer and FUNs can be assigned as inputs to other FUNs. The Kurzweil evaluates the FUNs sequentially, hence for this to work you would want to assign FUN1 as an input to FUN2, but not vice versa.

A program can be set to run in "global" mode as well. In this mode, certain modulation sources can affect all layers in a program instead of just affecting the current layer. Among other effects, in "global" mode the global LFO will always be running, instead of starting when a key is pressed. The behavior of other global modulation sources may also change in this mode.

V.A.S.T. includes a number of control sources. There are two LFOs ("LFO1" and "LFO2") with a user-assignable wave shape and frequency modulation source. "AMPENV" is the main ADSR (attack-decay-sustain-release) control source for the final amplifier in a layer and has multiple attack, decay, and release segments. "ENV1" and "ENV2" are bipolar envelopes, and "ASR1" and "ASR2" are two more unipolar envelopes. All of these can be set to loop for a fixed or infinite number of cycles, and the loop start and end points can be set to different stages of the envelopes. Also include are several random-number generators, clocks based on the internal or external MIDI master clock, key and note state, mono and polyphonic aftertouch, etc. A complete list of these can be found in section 25 of the K2000 user manual.

Features and specifications

Expansion options 
 Sampling A/D input & digital I/O
 Orchestral and/or Contemporary PCM ROM blocks
 P-RAM Program memory expansion
 Sample RAM up to 64MB (30-pin SIMMs)
 Internal hard drive

Models
 K2000 - Original keyboard version with a total of six audio outputs, configured as a main stereo pair and four assignable outputs. 
  K2000R - Rackmount version of the K2000 with a total of ten audio outputs, configured as a main stereo pair and eight assignable outputs.  The K2000R can accept the same P/RAM and ROM sound cards as the keyboard, although a different option board is required to add sampling capabilities.  
 K2000S and K2000RS - Same as the standard keyboard and rackmount versions,  but also shipped with the sampling option and 2Mb of sample RAM from the factory.
 K2vx (US $3,495) - A fully-optioned version of the K2000 keyboard which included an expanded ROM sample set (incorporating the Orchestral and Contemporary ROM blocks) made up of 24 MB total (vs. 8 MB on a stock K2000), a factory-installed P/RAM expansion and new ROM presets (based on those in the Kurzweil K2500). The K2vxS (US $4,195) added the sampling option and 2Mb of sample RAM from the factory.
 K2000VP and K2000VPR (US $1,995 / $1,795) - "VP" stands for "V.A.S.T. Player" - Base models with the then-latest OS v3.54 and new presets based on those in the K2500. They have 2Mb of sample RAM, though the sampling option is not included but can be added.

Notable users
 Robert Miles
 Rick Wright(Pink Floyd)
 Jean-Michel Jarre
 Jordan Rudess
 Depeche Mode
 Hardfloor
 Tori Amos
 Stevie Wonder
 Nick Rhodes (Duran Duran)
 Bon Harris (Nitzer Ebb)
 Wumpscut
 Front Line Assembly
 KMFDM
 Mark Van Hoen
 LTJ Bukem
 Nine Inch Nails
 Massive Attack
 Vangelis
 Tangerine Dream
 Laurent Garnier
 Luther Vandross
 Lito Vitale
 Josh Silver  (Type O Negative)
The Postal Service
Paul Shaffer (for the theme and music of the Late Show with David Letterman)

References

Further reading

External links
 Kurzweil's official website: http://www.kurzweil.com/
 K2000 user manual: http://kurzweil.com/content/migration/downloads/pub/Kurzweil/Pro_Products/K2000-K2vx-K2500/K2000-K2vx/Documentation/K2KMAN.ZIP
 K2000 v3 Sound On Sound review

K2000
Digital synthesizers
Music workstations
Polyphonic synthesizers
Samplers (musical instrument)